The Dubai Classic (also known as the Dubai Duty Free Classic for sponsorship and marketing purposes) was a professional ranking snooker tournament. The last champion was Ronnie O'Sullivan.

History 
It began life as the Dubai Masters in 1988, the first major tournament in the Middle East. The following year it was renamed to Dubai Classic, and it became the first ranking event in the Middle East. During its tenure in Dubai, the tournament was played at the multi-purpose stadium of the Al-Nasr Sports Club.

Later the event was moved to Thailand and renamed to Thailand Classic for 1995/96 and Asian Classic for 1996/97, before being dropped from the calendar.

Winners

See also

References

 
Snooker ranking tournaments
Recurring sporting events established in 1988
Recurring sporting events disestablished in 1996
1988 establishments in the United Arab Emirates
1996 disestablishments in Thailand
Defunct snooker competitions
Sports competitions in the United Arab Emirates
Sports competitions in Dubai